Larissa Kalaus (born 24 June 1996) is a Croatian handballer for RK Podravka Koprivnica and the Croatian national team.

She participated at the 2018 European Women's Handball Championship.

International honours
EHF European Cup:
Winner: 2017
Runner-up: 2021

Individual awards 
EHF European Cup Top Scorer: 2017, 2021

Personal life
She has an identical twin sister named Dora Kalaus who is also a handballer for RK Podravka Koprivnica.

References

External links

1996 births
Living people
Handball players from Zagreb
People from Križevci
Croatian female handball players
Identical twins
Twin sportspeople
Croatian twins
Kalaus
RK Podravka Koprivnica players
21st-century Croatian women